Vibrio natriegens is a Gram-negative marine bacterium. It was first isolated from salt marsh mud. It is a salt-loving organism (halophile) requiring about 2% NaCl for growth. It reacts well to the presence of sodium ions which appear to stimulate growth in Vibrio species, to stabilise the cell membrane, and to affect sodium-dependent transport and mobility. Under optimum conditions, and all nutrients provided, the doubling time of V. natriegens can be less than 10 minutes. In the laboratory, the growth medium can be easily changed, thus affecting the growth rate of a culture. V. natriegens is commonly found in estuarine mud. S.I. Paul et al. (2021) isolated and identified many strains of Vibrio natriegens from marine sponges of the Saint Martin's Island Area of the Bay of Bengal, Bangladesh.

Biochemical characteristics of V. natriegens 
Colony, morphological, physiological, and biochemical characteristics of Vibrio natriegens are shown in the Table below.

Note: + = Positive, – =Negative, V =Variable (+/–)

Biotechnological uses 
Owing to its rapid growth rate, ability to grow on inexpensive carbon sources, and capacity to secrete proteins into the growth media, efforts are underway to leverage this species as a host for molecular biology and biotechnology applications. Recently, V. natriegens crude extract has been shown by multiple research groups to be a promising platform for cell-free expression.

References

External links
Type strain of Vibrio natriegens at BacDive -  the Bacterial Diversity Metadatabase
University of Marburg 2018 iGEM team

Vibrionales

Marine microorganisms